Ghandruk Sign Language is a village sign language of the village of Ghandruk in central Nepal.

See also
Jumla Sign Language
Jhankot Sign Language
Maunabudhuk–Bodhe Sign Language
Nepalese Sign Language

References

Village sign languages
Sign languages of Nepal
Languages of Sudurpashchim Province